Gustavo Javier Alles Vila (born 9 April 1989) is a Uruguayan professional footballer who plays as a forward for Ecuadorian club Gualaceo.

Career
Alles came through the youth levels of Defensor Sporting, but never played for the first team. In early 2011, he signed a one-year loan with Racing, where he played 10 matches in the Uruguayan Primera División.

On 26 August 2014, he scored a goal against Paraguayan side Cerro Porteño in the 2014 Copa Sudamericana, which was the first goal ever for Rentistas in an international competition.

In July 2013, Alles signed with Liverpool Montevideo.

On 2 February 2015, he signed on loan with Turkish side Adana Demirspor.

References

External links
 
 

1989 births
Living people
Uruguayan footballers
Footballers from Montevideo
Association football forwards
Defensor Sporting players
Racing Club de Montevideo players
C.A. Progreso players
Liverpool F.C. (Montevideo) players
C.A. Rentistas players
Adana Demirspor footballers
Juventud de Las Piedras players
Sport Rosario footballers
CD Atlético Baleares footballers
C.D. Cuenca footballers
Uruguayan Primera División players
Uruguayan Segunda División players
TFF First League players
Peruvian Primera División players
Segunda División B players
Ecuadorian Serie A players
Uruguayan expatriate footballers
Expatriate footballers in Turkey
Uruguayan expatriate sportspeople in Turkey
Expatriate footballers in Peru
Uruguayan expatriate sportspeople in Peru
Expatriate footballers in Spain
Uruguayan expatriate sportspeople in Spain
Expatriate footballers in Ecuador
Uruguayan expatriate sportspeople in Ecuador